Operation S.I.N. is a five issue comic book miniseries published by Marvel Comics.

Publication history
The series was published in 2015 and designed to capitalize on the premiere of "Marvel's Agent Carter" on ABC and to tie into the 2014 Marvel crossover event Original Sin.

Plot
In the early 1950s, an alien energy source is discovered in Russia. Peggy Carter and Howard Stark try to find it - but a newly risen terrorist group named Hydra is also on the hunt for it. When the mysterious Woodrow McCord enters the picture and Stark accidentally causes a UFO to fire on Moscow, Peggy and her team must go underground. They discover a Hydra-run gulag that hides a mysterious woman just as Soviet scientists open a portal between worlds, and ancient terror is released.

Reception
Matt Little of CBR.com expressed that the comic had a well-designed debut full of great art and stylish dialogue, but it didn't do much to distinguish itself outside of being a period piece. Jesse Schedeen of IGN stated that story in this issue is pretty unremarkable but that the characters are charming and have a good relationship, the setting is well-done and the art is good.

Collected editions

See also
 2015 in comics

References

External links
 Operation S.I.N. at the Comic Book DB

Peggy Carter